Goldfinch is an English surname. Notable people with the surname include:

Arthur Horne Goldfinch (1866–1945), British businessman and Liberal Party politician
Duncan Goldfinch (1888–1960), South Australian painter
Henry Goldfinch (1781–1854), officer in the Royal Engineers
Murray Goldfinch (born 1984), Australian Paralympic athlete
Philip Henry Macarthur Goldfinch (1884–1943), Australian politician
Stephen Goldfinch (born 1982), American politician